Klobučar is an uninhabited island in Croatia. It is part of the Kornati archipelago, located in between the islands of Lavsa and Kasela. It is 0.166 km2 in area and has a coastline of 1.425 km. The highest point is 82 meters above sea.

References

Islands of the Adriatic Sea
Islands of Croatia
Uninhabited islands of Croatia
Landforms of Šibenik-Knin County